is a Japanese football player. He plays for Ventforet Kofu.

Playing career
Yuto Koizumi joined to J1 League club; Kashima Antlers in 2014.

Career statistics
Updated to 23 February 2016.

1Includes Japanese Super Cup and FIFA Club World Cup.

References

External links

1995 births
Living people
Association football people from Ibaraki Prefecture
Japanese footballers
J1 League players
J2 League players
J3 League players
Kashima Antlers players
J.League U-22 Selection players
Mito HollyHock players
Iwate Grulla Morioka players
Thespakusatsu Gunma players
Ventforet Kofu players
Association football goalkeepers